Borg is a diocese in the Church of Norway.  The diocese includes parishes in the counties of Østfold and Akershus, excluding Asker and Bærum. It was created in 1969 by separation from the Diocese of Oslo. The cathedral city is Fredrikstad.

Fredrikstad Cathedral
Fredrikstad Cathedral was designed by architect Waldemar F. Luhr and built in 1880. The cathedral as built of red brick  and has a capacity of 1,100 seats. It was originally named  Vestre Fredrikstad Church. When Borg diocese was created in 1968, the cathedral changed its name. The cathedral is in the Gothic Revival style. The stained-glass windows by Emanuel Vigeland date from 1917. The richly decorated pulpit and the colourful wooden altar piece, dating back to 1897, were the work of Wilhelm Peters and represents Jesus healing the blind man. The cathedral was restored and enlarged by architect  Arnstein Arneberg in 1954. The interior was designed by Norwegian painter Axel Revold.

Structure
The Diocese of Borg is divided into eight deaneries spread out over Viken county.  Each deanery corresponds a geographical area, usually one or more municipalities in the diocese.  Each municipality is further divided into one or more parishes which each contain one or more congregations.

List of bishops
 1969−1976 : Per Lønning
 1976−1977 : Andreas Aarflot
 1977−1990 : Gunnar Lislerud
 1990−1998 : Even Fougner
 1998−2005 : Ole Christian Kvarme
 2005–2012 : Helga Haugland Byfuglien
 2012–2021 : Atle Sommerfeldt
 2022-present : Kari Mangrud Alvsväg

References

External links
Diocese of Borg website
Fredrikstad Cathedral website

Organisations based in Fredrikstad
Borg
Christian organizations established in 1969
1969 establishments in Norway